Siedler is a surname of:

 Charles Siedler (May 24, 1839 in Münden, Germany – June 28, 1921 in Bloomfield, New Jersey), German-American politician, 20th Mayor of Jersey City, New Jersey
 Gerold Siedler (born August 16, 1933), German physical oceanographer
 Norbert Siedler (born 29 December 1982 in Wildschönau), Austrian racing driver
 Sebastian Siedler (born January 18, 1978), former racing cyclist from Germany
 Wolf Jobst Siedler (17 January 1926 – 27 November 2013), German publisher and writer

Surnames
German-language surnames
Surnames of German origin